"Just to Be Close to You" is a song by American R&B/funk band, Commodores, in 1976.  Released from their album, Hot on the Tracks, it would become one of their biggest hits, spending two weeks at the top of the Hot Soul Singles chart and becoming their second Billboard Hot 100 top ten, peaking at number seven. The song was written and sung by Lionel Richie.

Cash Box said that "there's a terrific spoken introduction, packed with soul, that gives way to a truly beautiful ballad."

Charts

See also
List of number-one R&B singles of 1976 (U.S.)

References

1976 songs
1976 singles
1993 singles
Commodores songs
Motown singles
Trey Lorenz songs
Epic Records singles
Songs written by Lionel Richie